The Men Without Names (French: Les hommes sans nom) is a 1937 French action film directed by Jean Vallée and starring Constant Rémy, Maurice Rémy and Arthur Devère. It portrays the French Foreign Legion in North Africa.

The film's sets were designed by the art director Jean d'Eaubonne.

Cast
 Constant Rémy as Le colonel de Joyeuse 
  as Le capitaine Vallerse 
 Arthur Devère as Schumbe, l'ordonnance 
  as Le lieutenant Djeroï 
 Lucien Gallas as Le sergent Brandt 
 Paulette Houry as Ijo 
 Tania Fédor as Madame de Joyeuse 
 Robert Ozanne as Pancraz 
 Charles Redgie as Le capitaine Willburn 
 A.S. Takal as Mohamed Hamou 
 Georges Péclet as Le capitaine Maréchal 
 Lucas Gridoux as Le caïd Hadj-Ayar 
 Thomy Bourdelle as Bordage

References

Bibliography 
 David Henry Slavin. Colonial Cinema and Imperial France, 1919–1939: White Blind Spots, Male Fantasies, Settler Myths. JHU Press, 2001.

External links 
 

1930s action films
French action films
1937 films
1930s French-language films
Films directed by Jean Vallée
Films about the French Foreign Legion
Films set in Africa
French black-and-white films
1930s French films